Vancouver Island Air is a Vancouver Island seaplane company serving the British Columbia Coast, based in Campbell River.

History
The airline has been in operation since 1985, offering charter and scheduled service with single and multi-engine aircraft on floats from Campbell River, British Columbia. The company was started by Larry Langford with a Cessna on floats and has grown to include five aircraft. It received media publicity during the 2010 Winter Olympics.

Destinations
Vancouver Island Air provides a year round scheduled service to various destinations including:
Campbell River (Campbell River Water Aerodrome)
Blind Channel (Blind Channel Water Aerodrome)
Burial Cove
Caviar Cove
Echo Bay (Gilford Island/Echo Bay Water Aerodrome)
Farewell Harbour
Glendale Cove
Greenway Sound
Kingcome Inlet
Lagoon Cove
Pierre's Bay
Port Neville
Sullivan Bay (Sullivan Bay Water Aerodrome)

Fleet
The Vancouver Island Air fleet as of September 2019:

The Transport Canada site also lists a Cessna 180 but with a cancelled certificate.

Previously Vancouver Island Air flew several types of Beechcraft Model 18.

References

External links

Official website

Airlines established in 1985
1985 establishments in British Columbia
Campbell River, British Columbia
Regional airlines of British Columbia
Canadian companies established in 1985
Seaplane operators